Ronald "Ron" Sandack was a Republican member of the Illinois House of Representatives, representing the 81st district from 2013 to 2016. Prior to his appointment Sandack was the Mayor of Downers Grove, Illinois, where he served from 2007 to 2011.

Early life and career
He received his Bachelor of Arts from the University of Illinois at Urbana-Champaign in 1986 and his Juris Doctor from DePaul University College of Law in 1989. Prior to his election as mayor, Sandack served on the Downers Grove Village Council. Sandack is married with two children.

Illinois General Assembly
Sandack was appointed to the Illinois Senate in 2010, replacing Daniel Cronin who resigned his position to become the chairman of the DuPage County Board.

From 2013 until his resignation, he was a member of the Illinois House of Representatives. Sandack was the Republican House floor leader and was known for being outspoken on social media, and was a strong supporter of Governor Bruce Rauner.

Sandack abruptly resigned from the Illinois House of Representatives on July 24, 2016, citing "cyber-security issues", claiming that he had found several fake social media accounts that were set up in his name. Downers Grove Republican David Olsen was appointed to fill Sandack's unexpired term and to take his place on the ballot in the November 2016 elections. Sandack's resignation was effective July 25, 2021. Local Republican leaders met and appointed Olsen to the seat. Olsen was sworn into office July 30, 2016.

Sandack served as an Illinois co-chair for the John Kasich's 2016 presidential campaign.

References

External links
Ron Sandack (R) 21st District at the Illinois General Assembly
By session: 99th, 98th, 97th, 96th
State Senator Ron Sandack
Ron Sandack for State Senator
 
Profile at Illinois State Senate Republicans
Ronald L. Sandack attorney profile at Gaido & Fintzen

Illinois lawyers
University of Illinois alumni
DePaul University College of Law alumni
Republican Party Illinois state senators
Republican Party members of the Illinois House of Representatives
Illinois city council members
Mayors of places in Illinois
Living people
Year of birth missing (living people)
People from Downers Grove, Illinois